The Bachtelblick-Schanze is a ski jumping hill in the town of  Gibswil, close to Fischenthal, Switzerland. It was built in 2005-06 and was opened in late 2006. In the summer it is covered with plastic matting. Close to this hill there is also a K28 and K14. The hill record, 65.5 m was set by Adrian Schuler, jumping for SC Einsiedeln.

References 

Ski jumping venues in Switzerland